Osii may refer to:
 Asii, an ancient people of Bactria
 Osi (ancient tribe), an ancient people of Central Europe